The Rogers–Ramanujan continued fraction  is a continued fraction discovered by    and independently by Srinivasa Ramanujan, and closely related to the Rogers–Ramanujan identities. It can be evaluated explicitly for a broad class of values of its argument.

Definition
 

Given the functions  and  appearing in the Rogers–Ramanujan identities, and assume ,

and,

The Rogers–Ramanujan continued fraction is then,

 denotes the Jacobi symbol.

One should be careful with notation since the formulas employing the j-function  will be consistent with the other formulas only if  (the square of the nome) is used throughout this section since the q-expansion of the j-function (as well as the well-known Dedekind eta function) uses . However, Ramanujan, in his examples to Hardy and given below, used the nome instead.

Special values
Since they have integral coefficients, the theory of complex multiplication implies that their values for  involving an imaginary quadratic field are algebraic numbers that can be evaluated explicitly.

Examples of R(q)

Given the general form where Ramanujan used the nome ,

when ,

when ,

when ,

when ,

when ,

when ,

when ,

Note that  is a positive root of the quartic equation,

(since  has a square root) which explains the similarity of the two closed-forms.

Incidentally, these continued fractions can be used to solve some quintic equations as shown in a later section.

Examples of G(q) and H(q)

However, since  uses the nome's square , then one should be careful with notation such that  and  use the same .

For example, the formulas above simplify to,

and,

Relation to modular forms

 can be related to the Dedekind eta function, a modular form of weight 1/2, as,

The Rogers-Ramanujan continued fraction can also be expressed in terms of the Jacobi theta functions. Recall the notation,

The notation  is slightly easier to remember since , with even subscripts on the LHS. Thus,

 
 
 
 

Note, however, that theta functions normally use the nome , while the Dedekind eta function uses the square of the nome , thus the variable x has been employed instead to maintain consistency between all functions. For example, let  so . Plugging this into the theta functions, one gets the same value for all three R(x) formulas which is the correct evaluation of the continued fraction given previously,

One can also define the elliptic nome,

The small letter k describes the elliptic modulus and the big letter K describes the complete elliptic integral of the first kind. The continued fraction can then be also expressed by the Jacobi elliptic functions as follows:

with

Relation to j-function

One formula involving the j-function and the Dedekind eta function is this:

where  Since also,

where the numerator and denominator are polynomial invariants of the icosahedron.

Let , then 

where

 

which in fact is the j-invariant of the elliptic curve,

parameterized by the non-cusp points of the modular curve .

Functional equation

For convenience, one can also use the notation  when q = e2πiτ. While other modular functions like the j-invariant satisfies,

and the Dedekind eta function has,

the functional equation of the Rogers–Ramanujan continued fraction involves the golden ratio ,

Incidentally,

Modular equations

Elegant ones for small prime n are as follows.

Regarding , note that

Other results

Ramanujan found many other interesting results regarding .

If  then,

If  then, 

The powers of  also can be expressed in unusual ways. For its cube,

where,

For its fifth power, let , then,

Quintic equations 

The general quintic equation in Bring-Jerrard form:

for every real value  can be solved in terms of Rogers-Ramanujan continued fraction  and the elliptic nome:

To solve this quintic, the elliptic modulus must first be determined as:

Then the real solution is:

where . Recall in the previous section the 5th power of  can be expressed by :

Example 1 

Transform to,

thus,

and the solution is:

and can not be represented by elementary root expressions.

Example 2 

thus,

Given the more familiar continued fractions with closed-forms,

with golden ratio  and the solution simplifies to:

References

External links

Mathematical identities
Q-analogs
Modular forms
Continued fractions
Srinivasa Ramanujan